The 1930 Brisbane Rugby League premiership was the 22nd season of Brisbane's semi-professional rugby league football competition. Six teams from across Brisbane competed for the premiership. The season culminated in Fortitude Valley defeating Carlton 10-0 in the grand final. As minor premiers, Carlton were allowed to challenge. The Grand final challenge was played a month later with Carlton winning 19-8 against Valleys and were thus determined as the premiers.

Ladder

Finals 

Source:

References 

1930 in rugby league
1930 in Australian rugby league
Rugby league in Brisbane